Catopsis is a genus in the botanical family Bromeliaceae, subfamily Tillandsioideae. The genus name is from the Greek “kata” (hanging down) and “opsis” (appearance). Catopsis is a genus of plants widespread across much of Latin America from Mexico to Brazil, plus Florida and the West Indies. One of the species, Catopsis berteroniana, is thought to be carnivorous.

Species

References

External links
 BSI Genera Gallery photos

 
Bromeliaceae genera